"Booby Trap" is a Nero Wolfe mystery novella by Rex Stout, first published in the August 1944 issue of The American Magazine. It first appeared in book form as the second novella in the short-story collection Not Quite Dead Enough, published by Farrar & Rinehart in 1944.

Plot summary

Major Goodwin has been working for Army Intelligence for some time already, and has recently concluded a dangerous mission concerning another problem besides the Nazis: greed by munitions contractors jockeying for post-war power, in the present case by industrial espionage concerning an advanced type of grenade.

Although Archie has managed to unravel a major piece of the puzzle by a recent mission in the South, another officer in his unit, Captain Cross, has just been murdered at a New York hotel, and the remaining members of the unit, plus Wolfe and Congressman Shattuck, have gathered in an Army office to discuss some anonymous letters that Shattuck, as Chairman of a Congressional war committee, has been receiving about how industrial espionage is compromising the war effort and is therefore a national security matter. During the meeting, one of the officers, whose son has just been killed in action in Europe, suddenly announces that he wants to go to Washington to confer with General Carpenter, the Pentagon official in charge of the unit. He has brought a suitcase with him, and his highly irregular request is granted. Earlier, Archie has been issued one of the advanced grenades in question which he kept in Wolfe's house, now his Army barracks, mostly as a souvenir, but Wolfe didn't like to have it in the house, and before the meeting Archie has returned the grenade to the Army—i.e. the same office.

The meeting breaks up, since the unit is rapidly depleting (one dead, another heading to Washington, the rest under scrutiny because of the letters). As Wolfe and Goodwin are returning to the building later on the same day, a massive explosion is heard. Since the building is operated clandestinely by Army Intelligence, the NYPD, in the shape of Inspector Cramer show up, but Wolfe and Goodwin's uncooperativeness, normal as it has been in civilian matters, confuses Cramer now that Goodwin wears an Army uniform — the same uniform Cramer's son is wearing in Australia. 

The story ends with Archie taking another date to the Flamingo Club — and not Lily Rowan. Unlike a Sam Spade or Raymond Chandler story, any actual romantic impulses that Archie may have are cleared into the wings, and even this final action is not necessarily a celebration but may itself contribute to the war effort in its own small way.

Publication history

"Booby Trap"
1944, The American Magazine, August 1944,  abridged

The unfamiliar word
"Nero Wolfe talks in a way that no human being on the face of the earth has ever spoken, with the possible exception of Rex Stout after he had a gin and tonic," said Michael Jaffe, executive producer of the A&E TV series, A Nero Wolfe Mystery. "Readers of the Wolfe saga often have to turn to the dictionary because of the erudite vocabulary of Wolfe and sometimes of Archie," wrote Rev. Frederick G. Gotwald.

Nero Wolfe's vocabulary is one of the hallmarks of the character. Examples of unfamiliar words — or unfamiliar uses of words that some would otherwise consider familiar — are found throughout the corpus, often in the give-and-take between Wolfe and Archie.

 Springe, chapter 8.

Not Quite Dead Enough
1944, New York: Farrar & Rinehart, September 7, 1944, hardcover
Contents include "Not Quite Dead Enough" and "Booby Trap"
In his limited-edition pamphlet, Collecting Mystery Fiction #9, Rex Stout's Nero Wolfe Part I, Otto Penzler describes the first edition of Not Quite Dead Enough: "Red cloth, front cover and spine printed with black; rear cover blank. Issued in a mainly black, red and blue pictorial dust wrapper. … The first edition has the publisher's monogram logo on the copyright page. the second printing, in the same year, is identical to the first except that the logo was dropped."
In April 2006, Firsts: The Book Collector's Magazine estimated that the first edition of Not Quite Dead Enough had a value of between $1,000 and $2,000.
1944, Toronto: Oxford University Press, 1944, hardcover
1944, New York: Detective Book Club #33, December 1944, hardcover
1944, New York: Detective Book Club, 1944, hardcover
1945, New York: Armed Services Edition #P-6, February 1945, paperback
1946, New York: Grosset & Dunlap, 1946, hardcover
New York: Lawrence E. Spivak, Jonathan Press #J27, not dated, paperback
1949, New York: Dell mapback #267, 1949, paperback
1963, New York: Pyramid (Green Door) #R-822, February 1963, paperback
1992, New York: Bantam Crimeline  October 1992, paperback, Rex Stout Library edition with introduction by John Lutz
1995, Burlington, Ontario: Durkin Hayes Publishing, DH Audio  July 1994, audio cassette (unabridged, read by Saul Rubinek)
2004, Auburn, California: The Audio Partners Publishing Corp., Mystery Masters  February 2004, audio CD (unabridged, read by Michael Prichard)
2010, New York: Bantam Crimeline  May 26, 2010, e-book

Adaptations

Nero Wolfe (Paramount Television)
"Booby Trap" is credited as the basis for the teleplay for "Gambit," the tenth episode of Nero Wolfe (1981), an NBC TV series starring William Conrad as Nero Wolfe and Lee Horsley as Archie Goodwin. Other members of the regular cast include George Voskovec (Fritz Brenner), Robert Coote (Theodore Horstmann), George Wyner (Saul Panzer) and Allan Miller (Inspector Cramer). Guest stars include Darren McGavin (John Alan Bredeman) and Patti Davis (Dana Groves). Directed by George McCowan from a teleplay by Stephen Kandel, "Gambit" aired April 3, 1981.

References

External links

Not Quite Dead Enough first edition dustjacket at the NYPL Digital Gallery

1944 short stories
Nero Wolfe short stories
Works originally published in The American Magazine